Schistura bairdi is a species of ray-finned fish in the genus Schistura.

This species has so far only been found in the mainstream Mekong River in southern Laos in the Khone Falls area, which is on the border with Stung Treng and Preah Vihear provinces in northeastern Cambodia.

Etymology 
This fish is named after Professor Ian G. Baird, Department of Geography, University of Wisconsin-Madison.

References 

 Kottelat, M. 2000. Diagnoses of a new genus and 64 new species of fishes from Laos (Teleostei:
Cyprinidae, Balitoridae, Bagridae, Syngnathidae, Chaudhuriidae and Tetraodontidae). Journal
of South Asian Natural History, 5 (1): 37-82.

B
Taxa named by Maurice Kottelat
Fish described in 2000